Beethoven Concerto is a 1936 Soviet film directed by Mikhail Gavronsky and Vladimir Schmidtgof.

Plot 
Two gifted boys learn to play the violin with Professor Malevich, who prepares the boys for the All-Union competition.

Cast 
 Mark Taimanov as Yanka Malevich
 Borya Vasilyev as Vladek Korsak
 Vladimir Gardin as Prof. Malevich
 Lyudmila Shabalina as Jenya
 Aleksandr Larikov as Korsak (as A. Larikov)
 Aleksandr Melnikov as Guide

References

External links 

1936 films
Films scored by Isaak Dunayevsky
1930s Russian-language films
Soviet black-and-white films